The 1956 Argus Trophy was a Formula Libre motor race held at the Albert Park Circuit in Victoria, Australia on 18 March 1956.
The race was contested over 48 laps, a total distance of 150 miles.
It was staged by the Light Car Club of Australia as the feature event on the second Sunday of the two-day "Moomba Meeting", which was held with the co-operation of the Moomba Festival organisers.

The race was won by Reg Hunt driving a Maserati 250F.

Results

 Starters: 22
 Winner's race time: 1:28:32
 Fastest lap: Reg Hunt, Maserati 250F, 1:59, 94.5 mph
 Attendance: 70,000

Notes & references

External links
 Michael Armit, Only one car to pass - and his engine boiled, The Argus, Monday, 19 March 1956, page 14, as archived at trove.nla.gov.au
 1956 ‘Argus Trophy’ Albert Park: Reg Hunt and Lex Davison: Maserati 250F and A6GCM: Ferrari Tipo 500…, primotipo.com, as archived at web.archive.org

Argus Trophy
Motorsport at Albert Park
March 1956 sports events in Australia